Guillaume Geefs (10 September 1805 – 19 January 1883), also Willem Geefs, was a Belgian sculptor. Although known primarily for his monumental works and public portraits of statesmen and nationalist figures, he also explored mythological subject matter, often with an erotic theme.

Life
Guillaume Geefs was born in Antwerp, Belgium, the eldest of six brothers in a family of sculptors, the best-known of whom are Joseph Geefs (1808–1885, winner of the Prix de Rome in 1836) and Jean Geefs (1825–1860, and winner of the prize in 1846). Guillaume first studied at the Royal Academy of Fine Arts Antwerp under the late–Flemish Baroque sculptor Jan Frans van Geel and his son, Jan Lodewijk van Geel, who was also a sculptor. He completed his training under Jean-Etienne Ramey at the École des Beaux-Arts in Paris and began exhibiting his work in 1828.

In 1829, Geefs traveled to Italy. When he returned to Antwerp, he began teaching at the art academy. During the 1830s, he executed the colossal work Victims of the Revolution at Brussels, as well as numerous statues and busts. In 1836, he married Isabelle Marie Françoise Corr, a Brussels-born painter of Irish descent known professionally as Fanny Geefs. In the mid-19th century, the sculptor Guillaume-Joseph Charlier was an assistant to him and his brother Joseph.

The Geefs family played a leading role in the craze for public sculpture that followed Belgian independence in the 1830s, producing several propagandistic monuments that emphasized a "historical continuity of the southern Low Countries in the new independent state".

Honours 
 1875 : Officer in the Order of Leopold.  
 1881 : Grand Officer in the Order of Leopold.
 Knight of the Order of the Immaculate Conception of Vila Viçosa.
 Knight of the Order of Saint Michael.
 Member of the Royal Academy of Science, Letters and Fine Arts of Belgium.

As an artist
Geefs' early work has been characterized as "predominately elegiac in mood". By the end of the 1830s, however, he developed a powerful, spare realism in monumental works such as General Belliard and Frédéric de Mérode (erected in Brussels, 1836–37) and Peter Paul Rubens (Antwerp, 1841). He was prolific in producing tombs, pulpits, statues, busts, and sculpture groups.

Works

The works of Guillaume Geefs include:
 Epitaphe of count Jacques Coghen, Belgian Minister of Finance (1831–1832), Cemetery of Laeken
 Frédéric de Mérode (1833/1837), tomb monument, "noted for its naturalness and lack of idealization"
 General Belliard (1836), Rue Royale/Koningsstraat in Brussels; more than life-size
 Monument to the Martyrs of the 1830 Revolution (1836–38), an allegorical monument commemorating the Belgian Revolution, on Martyrs' Square in Brussels
 Leopold I, considered one of the most important works of public art in Belgium in the 19th century; a stamp issued in 1981 commemorates this statue; it may be viewed online
 Treurende Adonis (1839), white marble of Adonis in mourning
 A small sculpture of a young sleeping angel, privately held and not authenticated (but signed by the artist), found in 1993 in an abandoned house in Brussels
Grétry (1842), bronze statue of the composer, in front of the opera house in Liège
 Le génie du mal, a Lucifer in white marble for the Cathedral of St. Paul in Liège
 Charlemagne (1843), statue in the Basilica of Saint Servatius in Maastricht
 The Roman Gladiator, located opposite the M. H. de Young Memorial Museum in San Francisco, to mark the ground-breaking for the 1894 Mid-Winter Exposition
 Le lion amoreux or The Amorous Lion (1851), marble, Royal Museums of Fine Arts of Belgium

 Gardel Memorial (1864), a 25-foot pyramid memorial in Mount Vernon Cemetery in Philadelphia, with statues depicting Africa, Asia, Europe, Hope and Faith
 A statue of Isabelle Brunelle (1872) in the garden of the almshouse that she founded in Namur.

Assessment
In his lifetime, Geefs' work was considered by some to be marred by "frivolous and inessential" details and "poverty of thought", together with a perceived frigidity of expression in his modelling. He is now regarded as the dominant Belgian sculptor of his time.

References

External links

 Two statues by Guillaume Geefs
 Bio on Philatelia.net

1805 births
1883 deaths
Royal Academy of Fine Arts (Antwerp) alumni
Academic staff of the Royal Academy of Fine Arts (Antwerp)
Members of the Royal Academy of Belgium
People from Borgerhout
19th-century Belgian sculptors
19th-century Belgian male artists